Samuel Watson Kennedy (8 April 1881 – 31 August 1955) was a Scottish footballer who played as a centre forward.

Career
Born in Girvan, Kennedy played club football for Ayr and Partick Thistle, and made one appearance for Scotland in 1905.

References

1881 births
1955 deaths
Scottish footballers
Scottish Football League players
Scotland international footballers
People from Girvan
Footballers from South Ayrshire
Ayr F.C. players
Partick Thistle F.C. players
Association football forwards